Nikhil Tandon is an Indian endocrinologist, medical academic and the head of the department of endocrinology, metabolism and diabetes at the All India Institute of Medical Sciences. He is a recipient of Dr. B. C. Roy Award, the highest Indian medical award in 2005 and was honoured by the Government of India in 2015 with Padma Shri, the fourth highest Indian civilian award.

Biography
Nikhil Tandon was born on 28 November 1963 in Delhi. He secured his master's degree (MD) from the All India Institute of Medical Sciences, Delhi, obtained his doctoral degree (PhD) from the University of Cambridge and returned to India in 1993 to join AIIMS as a member of its faculty. He has stayed with AIIMS ever since and is a professor and the head of the department of endocrinology, metabolism and diabetes at the institution. He has been the national co-ordinator for Action in Diabetes and Vascular Diseases (ADVANCE), a study conducted by The George Institute for Global Health, Australia for combating the risks of diabetes and prevent it becoming a global epidemic and has been a member of the steering committee of Center for Cardio-metabolic Risk Reduction in South Asia (CARRS) Trial funded by the National Heart Lung and Blood Institute. He also serves as a member of the faculty of Emory University.

Tandon is a former vice-president of the National Academy of Sciences, India and a president and the incumbent general secretary of the Indian Society for Bone and Mineral Research. He has served as an executive committee member of the Endocrine Society of India and is its president. He is an elected fellow of the National Academy of Sciences, India and a fellow of the National Academy of Medical Sciences and the Royal College of Physicians of London. He has been associated with several national and international bodies such as Indian Council of Medical Research, Defence Research and Development Organization, Department of Biotechnology, National Institutes of Health, Institute for International Health and British Heart Foundation for research on thyroid epidemiology, diabetes and metabolic bone diseases and has participated in many clinical trials. His research findings have been published in several national and international journals, PubMed listing 454 of them in their online repository. He has also featured in the news for the pituitary tumor surgery of the then tallest woman in the world, Siddiqa Parveen.

The Medical Council of India awarded him Dr. B. C. Roy Award in the medical teaching category in 2005. The Government of India followed it up with the civilian award of Padma Shri in 2015. He lives at the Asian Games Village in New Delhi.

References

Further reading

External links
 
 

Recipients of the Padma Shri in medicine
Living people
Medical doctors from Delhi
1963 births
Indian endocrinologists
Indian medical academics
Indian medical researchers
Indian medical writers
All India Institute of Medical Sciences, New Delhi alumni
Academic staff of the All India Institute of Medical Sciences, New Delhi
Alumni of the University of Cambridge
Emory University faculty
Emory University people
Dr. B. C. Roy Award winners
Fellows of the National Academy of Medical Sciences
20th-century Indian medical doctors